Boronia molloyae, commonly called the tall boronia, is a plant in the citrus family that is endemic to coastal regions in the south-west of Western Australia. It is a shrub with pinnate leaves that mostly have between three and seven leaflets, and deep rose pink, four-petalled flowers. It usually grows along streams in sandy soil.

Description
There are eight stamens, with the four nearest the sepals sterile and longer than those near the petals. Flowering occurs from September to December.

Taxonomy and naming
In 1843, James Drummond published a description of a plant he called Boronia molloyi in the London Journal of Botany. He named it "after the lady of Capt. Molloy", botanical collector Georgiana Molloy. Drummond did not provide a Latin diagnosis. The same species was given the name Boronia elatior by Friedrich Gottlieb Bartling in 1844 and B. semifertilis by Ferdinand von Mueller in 1861. In 1998 Paul G. Wilson used the name Boronia molloyae, an orthographic variant of Drummond's name, and chose Bartling's specimen as the lectotype. The specific epithet (molloyae) honours Georgiana Molloy.

Distribution and habitat
Tall boronia grows in sandy soils along watercourses and near swamps between Gingin and Albany in the Jarrah Forest, Swan Coastal Plain and Warren biogeographic regions.

Conservation
Boronia molloyae is classified as "not threatened" by the Government of Western Australia Department of Parks and Wildlife.

References

External links

molloyae
Rosids of Western Australia
Plants described in 1844